Otocinclus hasemani is a species of catfish in the family Loricariidae. It is native to South America, where it occurs in the Tocantins and Parnaíba basins. It reaches 2.7 cm (1.1 inches) SL.

References 

Hypoptopomatini
Fish described in 1915